Air Marshal Sir Thomas Arthur Warne-Browne,  (21 July 1898 – 13 October 1962), was a senior Royal Air Force officer who served as Air Officer Commanding-in-Chief Maintenance Command from 1949 to 1952.

RAF career
Warne-Browne served with the Royal Naval Air Service and Royal Air Force in the First World War being awarded the Distinguished Service Cross for a reconnaissance over Bruges and Blankenberge under heavy anti-aircraft fire in March 1918. He was appointed Officer Commanding No. 22 Squadron in 1934 and a Squadron Commander at No. 1 Flying Training School in 1936. Later that year he became Senior Engineering Officer at RAF Gosport. He also served in the Second World War as Senior Engineer Staff Officer at Headquarters RAF Coastal Command from 1942 until the end of the war. After the War he became Air Officer Commanding No. 43 Group and then joined the Senior Technical Staff Officer at RAF Mediterranean and Middle East in 1947 before becoming Air Officer Commanding-in-Chief at RAF Maintenance Command in 1949 and retiring in 1953.

He lived at Chilbolton near Stockbridge in Hampshire.

References

1898 births
1962 deaths
Royal Air Force air marshals
Royal Air Force personnel of World War I
Royal Air Force personnel of World War II
Knights Commander of the Order of the British Empire
Companions of the Order of the Bath
Recipients of the Distinguished Service Cross (United Kingdom)